Square leg is also a fielding position in cricket; see Fielding (cricket).

Square Leg was a 1980 British government home defence Command Post and field exercise, which tested the Transition to War and Home Defence roles of the Ministry of Defence and British government. Part of the exercise involved a mock nuclear attack on Britain. It was assumed that 131 nuclear weapons would fall on Britain with a total yield of 205 megatons (69 ground burst; 62 air burst) with yields of 500 KT to 3 MT That was felt to be a reasonably realistic scenario, but the report stated that a total strike in excess of 1,000 megatons would be likely.

Mortality was estimated at 29 million (53 percent of the population), serious injuries at 7 million (12 percent), and short-term survivors at 19 million (35 percent).

Square Leg was criticised for a number of reasons: the weapons used were exclusively in the high-yield megaton range, with an average of 1.5 megatons per bomb, but a realistic attack based on known Soviet capabilities would have seen mixed weapons yields, including many missile-based warheads in the low-hundred-kiloton range.  Also, no targets in Inner London are attacked (for example, Whitehall, the centre of British government); towns such as Eastbourne are hit for no obvious reason.

Operation Square Leg was one of the exercises used to estimate the destructiveness of a Soviet nuclear attack in the 1984 BBC production Threads.

Exercise Square Leg: main events and civil and armed forces actions

Transition to War 
The following table shows the hypothetical pre-strike event list drawn from the national Main Event List for Square Leg, testing the Transition to War stage.

Survival 
The 'survival' stage details the events that occurred post nuclear attack, based on extracts from the War Diary of Warwickshire County that was used during Square Leg.

Recovery 
The 'recovery' phase reports are drawn from the Gloucestershire log of requests for military support.

See also
 Nuclear weapons and the United Kingdom
 World War III
 The Warsaw Pact operation Seven Days to the River Rhine
 RAF Greenham Common airfield

References
 Doomsday, Britain after Nuclear Attack, Stan Openshaw, Philip Steadman and Owen Greene, Basil Blackwell, 1983 
 War Plan UK, Duncan Campbell, 
 The National Archives, FCO 46/2446, 2447, 2448

Footnotes

Nuclear warfare
United Kingdom nuclear command and control
Cold War history of the United Kingdom
1980 in the United Kingdom